Chế Linh (b. 1942) is a Vietnamese popular singer, songwriter. An ethnic Cham, his stage name Chế Linh is a Vietnamese transcription of his Cham name, but, like many Cham people, he also has an official Vietnamese legal name, Lưu Văn Liên.

Early life 
In 1958, when Che Linh was 16 years old, an event changed his life when President Ngo Dinh Diem had forbidden teaching of the Cham language in the Cham villages, a prestige language considered as a second language since the Bảo Đại’s era.

This discrimination toward the minority group created conflicts between the Chams and the Kinh inhabitants. When the Chams came to town, they were stopped and being prosecuted heavily. Che Linh has been injured on several incidents, however. The government ignored these incidences and was not a bit concerned about it.

Che Linh moving to Saigon was considered his first escape. Traveling to an unknown and unfamiliar place, with no relatives and no friends to turn to. He was disgusted with the presidential ruling of President Diem, and a lot of patriotism for his people.

Fortunately, Che Linh found a small job with a respected employer. After nine months, Che Linh decided to go back to school. He attended Bo De and later to Nguyen Cong Tru.

Career

1960-1961 
First time entering the musical industry.

Biet Chinh Biên Hòa Musical Group was selecting new singers to entertain the far-away village in the Biên Hòa Provincce.

Che Linh participated and won first prize. Not considering singing as a career at the time, but only because the pay is considerably high.  Two years later, the group faded and dissolved and Che Linh became a driver for heavy construction organization in Bien Hoa.  The love for music and as a hobby, Che Linh continues to learn the music, train his voice and composed several songs. Che Linh's musical career strongly excelled, and his first two songs were born: "Dem buon tinh le” and “Dem buoc co don”

Recognizing that music is the shortest way to bring understanding between the Kinh and the Chams and all the other ethnic groups, Che Linh promised to continue and excel in the musical industry. With his effort and talents, Che Linh became a famous star and had sung together with many artists such as Anh Ngọc, Duy Khánh, Thái Thanh, Thanh Thúy, Minh Hiếu, Tùng Lâm. Continental Productions produced his first record, "Vùng Biển Trời Và Màu Áo Em”. Che Linh then signed with several Viet Nam Record Companies.

1964-1965 

He produced and wrote many songs.

1972 
Awarded by Kim Khánh for Best Male Artist/Vocal which was organized by the Daily Newspaper Trang Den. The Government of South Vietnam then forbade Che Linh's voice and songs during the summer war period.

1975 
Che Linh was hoping to have his music released from the forbidden list, however he was jailed as a revolutionary at Song Mao, then My Duc.

1978 
He was released from prison 28 months later.

1980 
Escaped to Malaysia and later settled in Canada where he now resides in Toronto.

He is presently performing, singing, writing and producing music.

Compositions 
All of Che Linh's songs which he wrote goes under the name of Tu Nhi.

References

External links 

 Official Website: https://chelinh.com
 Official Facebook: https://facebook.com/chelinhsinger
 Official YouTube: https://youtube.com/chelinh

1942 births
Living people
20th-century Vietnamese male singers
Vietnamese Cham people
Vietnamese Hindus
People from Ninh Thuận province
Vietnamese emigrants to Canada